Claron McFadden (born 1961) is an American soprano. McFadden studied voice at the Eastman School of Music in Rochester, New York, finishing her degree in 1984.

She gained international fame when making her Glyndebourne Festival Opera debut in the title role of the opera Lulu, conducted by Sir Andrew Davis.

As well as singing many of the major oratorio works, McFadden became particularly world-famous for her interpretation of modern and contemporary music.

McFadden is currently based in Amsterdam, the Netherlands.

Opera performances 
 Les Arts Florissants (William Christie)
 De Nederlandse Opera
 Salzburg Festival
 Opéra-Comique
 Bregenzer Festspiele
 Aix-en-Provence Festival
 La Monnaie (Brussels)
 Royal Opera

Awards 
On 23 August 2007 McFadden was awarded the Amsterdam Prize for the Arts (Amsterdam Funding for the Arts, The Netherlands) by Amsterdam Mayor Job Cohen.

World creations 
The Woman Who Walked into Doors (2004), Kris Defoort
VSPRS (2005), Alain Platel
 Orrori dell’Amore (1996), The Accacha Chronicles (2005), Love Is the Only Master I’ll Serve (2006), Nicholas Lens
 Inside Covers (3 tracks), The Home Made Orchestra (2004)

References

External links
 Official website
 "Singing the primal mystery" at TED

1961 births
Living people
American operatic sopranos
Musicians from Amsterdam
Eastman School of Music alumni
Singers from New York City
American expatriates in the Netherlands
20th-century American women opera singers
21st-century American women opera singers